The Magritte Award for Best Screenplay (French: Magritte du meilleur scénario original ou adaptation) is an award presented annually by the Académie André Delvaux. It is one of the Magritte Awards, which were established to recognize excellence in Belgian cinematic achievements.

The 1st Magritte Awards ceremony was held in 2011 with Jaco Van Dormael receiving the award for his work in Mr. Nobody. As of the 2022 ceremony, Ann Sirot and Raphaël Balboni are the most recent winners in this category for their work in Madly in Life.

Winners and nominees
In the list below, winners are listed first in the colored row, followed by the other nominees.

2010s

2020s

References

External links
 Magritte Awards official website
 Magritte Award for Best Screenplay at AlloCiné

Screenplay
Screenwriting awards for film